Dundas Harbour (Inuktitut: Talluruti, "a woman's chin with tattoos on it") is an abandoned settlement in the Qikiqtaaluk Region, Nunavut, Canada. It is located on Devon Island at the eastern shore of the waterway also named Dundas Harbour. Baffin Bay's Croker Bay is immediately to the west.

An outpost was established at the harbour in August 1924 as part of a government presence intended to curb foreign whaling and other activity. The Hudson's Bay Company leased the outpost in 1933. The following year, 52 Inuit were relocated from Kinngait (then called Cape Dorset) to Dundas Harbour but they returned to the mainland 13 years later.

Dundas Harbour was populated again in the late 1940s to maintain a patrol presence, but it was closed again in 1951 due to ice difficulties. The Royal Canadian Mounted Police detachment was moved to Craig Harbour on southern Ellesmere Island.

Only the ruins of a few buildings remain, along with one of the northernmost cemeteries in Canada.

See also
 List of communities in Nunavut

References

Ghost towns in Nunavut
Hudson's Bay Company trading posts in Nunavut
Ports and harbours of Nunavut
Former populated places in the Qikiqtaaluk Region
Devon Island